Glinianka  is a village in the administrative district of Gmina Wiązowna, within Nisko County, Mazovian Voivodeship, in south-eastern Poland. The village last recorded a population of about 600 people.

References

Glinianka